Osterby Man or the Osterby Head is a bog body of which only the skull and hair survived. It was discovered in 1948 by peat cutters to the southeast of Osterby, Germany. The hair is tied in a Suebian knot. The head is at the State Archaeological Museum at Gottorf Castle in Schleswig, Schleswig-Holstein.

Discovery
It was found approximately  beneath the current ground level. The head was wrapped in fragments of a deerskin cape, which Max Müller noticed protruding from the peat. The find was reported to the museum in Schleswig; despite intensive searching by the brothers and others, no more of the body has been found.

Description and analysis
The skull was wrapped in fragments of a deerskin cape and had been damaged by being struck with a blunt object before it was sunk in the bog.

Anthropology
The skull had been broken into several pieces. The acids in the bog have decalcified the bone, which has shrunk somewhat and is dark brown. The hair and small sections of scalp are well preserved, but the skin and other soft tissues of the face have disappeared. The skull had also been deformed by the weight of the peat above it, but the facial area was generally well preserved. Skeletal evidence suggests a man 50 to 60 years of age. Hack marks on the second cervical vertebra show that the head was cut off. The skull was stabilised for exhibition by filling with gypsum.

It has been coloured a reddish brown by the acids in the bog; microscopic analysis showed that it had been dark blond and that the man had had some white hairs. In a re-examination in 2005, isotopic analysis showed that at least during his last year of life, the man ate meat remarkably rarely, and did not eat seafood. Parasitological analysis of the hair showed no head lice, unusual for the time.

Hairstyle
The hair is unusually well preserved and is tied above the right temple in a Suebian knot. Tacitus describes this in Chapter 38 of his Germania as a characteristic of free men among the Germanic tribe of Suebi. The knot appears in several Roman depictions and on at least one other bog body, Dätgen Man (who wore his on the back of his head). Osterby has featured the Suebian knot on its coat of arms since 1998.

Skin cape
Microscopic analysis suggested on the basis of the hairs that they were from roe deer. All seams had been sewn with small stitches in catgut. Some appeared to be repairs. Textile archaeologists identified the garment as a skin cape; similar cloaks or capes have been found with other archaeological finds, including Elling Woman, Haraldskær Woman, Dröbnitz Girl, Kayhausen Boy and Jührdenerfeld Man.

Treatment
Peter Löhr performed the anthropological analysis, which determined that the skull had shrunk while immersed in the bog. For his doctoral dissertation, he performed experiments on it involving repeated soaking and drying and detailed measurements; in his view, soaking caused it to swell to almost its original dimensions. Löhr's data included markedly shrunk teeth and the complete lower jaw associated with the skull, which has a protruding chin. However, more recent analysis has shown that in his original preparation of the skull for exhibition, Karl Schlabow added an unrelated lower jaw.

Dating
The Suebian knot indicates the man died in the Late Iron Age or the Roman period, and radiocarbon dating likewise indicates a date between 75 and 130 CE; however, the hair sample used was taken from Alfred Dieck's private collection and may thus be unreliable.

Analysis
Other Iron Age bog bodies have also been beheaded; the body of Dätgen Man, who also had a Suebian knot, was found several metres from his head. The beheading together with the fractured skull indicates deliberate execution by multiple methods. It is impossible to determine whether Osterby Man was sunk in the bog as a judicial punishment or a sacrifice, or whether his body was also deposited in the bog; but it has been suggested that his relatively advanced age may indicate an honorable death.

See also
Stidsholt Woman

References

Further reading
Michael Gebühr. Moorleichen in Schleswig-Holstein. Verein zur Förderung des Archäologischen Landesmuseums e.V., Schloß Gottorf. Neumünster: Wachholtz, 2002,  
Karl Schlabow. "Haartracht und Pelzschulterkragen der Moorleiche von Osterby". Offa 8 (1949) 3–7 

75 deaths
130 deaths
1948 in Germany
1948 archaeological discoveries
Bog bodies
Deaths by decapitation
Germanic archaeological artifacts
Year of birth unknown